Dorcadion arietinum is a species of beetle in the family Cerambycidae. It was described by Jakovlev in 1897.

Subspecies
 Dorcadion arietinum arietinum Jakovlev, 1897
 Dorcadion arietinum charynensis Danilevsky, 1996
 Dorcadion arietinum chilikensis Danilevsky, 1996
 Dorcadion arietinum ketmeniensis Danilevsky, 1996
 Dorcadion arietinum lucae Pic, 1898
 Dorcadion arietinum phenax Jakovlev, 1900
 Dorcadion arietinum zhalanash Danilevsky, 1996

See also 
 Dorcadion

References

arietinum
Beetles described in 1897